Shrilal Shukla (31 December 1925 – 28 October 2011) was a Hindi writer, notable for his satire. He worked as a PCS officer for the state government of Uttar Pradesh, later inducted into the IAS. He has written over 25 books, including Raag Darbari, Makaan, Sooni Ghaati Ka Sooraj, Pehla Padaav and Bisrampur Ka Sant.

Shukla has highlighted the falling moral values in the Indian society in the post independence era through his novels. His writings expose the negative aspects of life in rural and urban India in a satirical manner. His best known work Raag Darbari has been translated into English and 15 Indian languages. A television serial based on this continued for several months on the national network in the 1980s. It is a little-known fact that he also wrote a detective novel entitled Aadmi Ka Zahar which was serialised in the weekly magazine 'Hindustan'.

Awards

Shukla received the Jnanpith Award, the highest Indian literary award, in 2011. His first major award was the Sahitya Akademi Award for his novel Raag Darbari in 1969. He received the Vyas Samman award in 1999 for the novel Bisrampur ka Sant. In 2008, he was awarded the Padma Bhushan by the President of India for his contribution to Indian literature and culture. On his 80th birthday in December 2005, his friends, peers, family and fans organised a literary and cultural event in New Delhi. To mark the occasion, a volume titled Shrilal Shukla – Jeevan Hi Jeevan was issued about him which contains the writings of eminent literary personalities such as Dr. Naamvar Singh, Rajendra Yadav, Ashok Bajpai, Doodhnath Singh, Nirmala Jain, Leeladhar Jagudi, Gillian Wright, Kunwar Narayan and Raghuvir Sahay among others. His friends, family and fans also contributed to the book.

Personal account

1925 – Born in village Atrauli   in Mohanlalganj , Lucknow district of Uttar Pradesh
1947 – Graduated from Allahabad University
1949 – Entry into the Civil Service
1957 – First novel Sooni Ghaati Ka Sooraj published
1958 – First collection of satire Angad Ka Paanv published
1970 – Awarded the Sahitya Akademi Award for Raag Darbari (for 1969)
1978 – Awarded the Madhya Pradesh Hindi Sahitya Parishad Award for Makaan
1979–80 – Served as Director of the Bhartendu Natya Academy, Uttar Pradesh
1981 – Represented India at the International Writers' Meet in Belgrade
1982–86 – Member of the Advisory Board of the Sahitya Akademi
1983 – Retirement from the Indian Administrative Service
1987–90 – Awarded the Emeritus Fellowship by the ICCR, Government of India
1988 – Given the Sahitya Bhushan Award by Uttar Pradesh Hindi Sansthaan
1991 – Awarded the Goyal Sahitya Puraskaar by Kurukshetra University
1994 – Awarded the Lohia Sammaan by Uttar Pradesh Hindi Sansthaan
1996 – Awarded the Sharad Joshi Sammaan by the Madhya Pradesh Government
1997 – Awarded the Maithili Sharan Gupta Sammaan by the Madhya Pradesh Government
1999 – Awarded the Vyas Sammaan by the Birla Foundation
2005 – Awarded the Yash Bharati Samman by the Uttar Pradesh Government
2008 – Awarded the Padma Bhushan by the President of India
2011 – Awarded the Jnanpith Award for year 2009.

Literary works

Novels

Sooni Ghaati Ka Sooraj – 1957
Agyaatvaas – 1962
 Raag Darbari (novel) – 1968 – original is in Hindi; an English translation was published under the same title in 1993 by Penguin Books; also translated and published by National Book Trust, India in 15 Indian languages.
Aadmi Ka Zahar – 1972
Seemayein Tootati Hain – 1973
Makaan – 1976 – original is in Hindi; a Bengali translation was published in the late 1970s.
Pehla Padaav – 1987 – original is in Hindi; an English translation was published as Opening Moves by Penguin International in 1993.
Bisrampur Ka Sant – 1998
Babbar Singh Aur Uske Saathi – 1999 – original is in Hindi; an English translation was published as Babbar Singh And his Friends in 2000 by Scholastic Inc. New York.
Raag Viraag – 2001

Satires

Angad Ka Paanv – 1958
Yahaan Se Vahaan – 1970
Meri Shreshtha Vyangya Rachnayein – 1979
Umraaonagar Mein Kuchh Din – 1986
Kuchh Zameen Mein Kuchh Hava Mein – 1990
Aao Baith Lein Kuchh Der – 1995
Agli Shataabdi Ka Sheher – 1996
Jahaalat Ke Pachaas Saal – 2003
Khabron Ki Jugaali – 2005

Short Story Collections

Yeh Ghar Mera Nahin – 1979
Suraksha Tatha Anya Kahaaniyan – 1991
Iss Umra Mein – 2003
Dus Pratinidhi Kahaaniyan – 2003

Memoirs

Mere Saakshaatkaar – 2002
Kuchh Saahitya Charcha Bhi – 2008

Literary Critique

Bhagwati Charan Varma – 1989
Amritlal Naagar – 1994
Agyeya: Kuchh Rang Kuchh Raag – 1999

Edited Works

Hindi Haasya Vyangya Sankalan – 2000

Literary travels

He has visited Yugoslavia, Germany, UK, Poland, Surinam for various literary seminars, conferences and to receive awards. He has also headed a delegation of writers sent by the Government of India to China.

Family
Shukla died in Lucknow on 28 October 2011 at around 11.45 am after a prolonged illness, fourteen years after the death of his wife Girija, who had been his true companion who passionately shared his love of classical music and literature. Shri Lal Shukla has four children – daughters Rekha Awasthi and Madhulika Mehta who are musically talented homemakers;son Ashutosh Shukla who works in a corporate cooperative concern and lastly youngest daughter Dr. Vinita Mathur who is a professor in Geography in the University of Delhi. He has eight grandchildren and five great-grandchildren.

See also
 List of Indian writers

References

Indian male novelists
Indian satirists
Indian civil servants
Hindi-language writers
1925 births
2011 deaths
Writers from Uttar Pradesh
Recipients of the Padma Bhushan in literature & education
Recipients of the Jnanpith Award
Recipients of the Sahitya Akademi Award in Hindi
20th-century Indian novelists
20th-century Indian male writers